Grupo de Acción Rápida (GAR) is the rural police tactical unit of the Spanish Civil Guard.

Tracing its origins to the Unidad Antiterrorista Rural (UAR) formed in April 1978. The Grupo Antiterrorista Rural was formed in 1982 and later renamed to Grupo de Acción Rápida. It is based in Logroño.

Initially aimed to counter ETA, since 1998 it has re-oriented towards international deployments, taking part in NATO, United Nations and European Union missions in Bosnia, Kosovo, Afghanistan, Lebanon, Haiti and the Central African Republic.

Applicants to GAR have to complete over five months of training with between 25% and 30% completing the course.

Firearms used include the Heckler & Koch USP Compact 9×19mm, Heckler & Koch MP5 9×19mm and the Heckler & Koch HK417 7.62×51mm respectively.

References 

Civil Guard (Spain)
Police tactical units